Brad William Johnson (October 24, 1959 – February 18, 2022) was an American actor, model, real estate agent, and Marlboro Man.

Biography
Johnson was born in Tucson, Arizona, the son of Grove and Virginia Johnson. The family moved to Grants Pass, Oregon, and later, Dallas, Texas, where Brad graduated high school in 1977. After competing in rodeos as a youth, he began his professional rodeo career in 1984 and was discovered by a movie scout looking for cowboys to star in a beer commercial. This led to his stint as the Marlboro Man and modeling gigs for Calvin Klein before he started acting. His first role was in a 1986 episode of the CBS soap opera Dallas.

His first film credit was in the low-budget biker film Nam Angels (1989), and shortly after he had his first co-starring role, in Steven Spielberg's 1989 film Always. Other films included Flight of the Intruder, Philadelphia Experiment II, The Birds II: Land's End, Copperhead and Supergator. He played Rayford Steele in the Left Behind film series and played Dr. Dominick O'Malley on Melrose Place.

His work as an actor and as a Marlboro Man — one of a succession used by the brand — brought Johnson and his wife, Laurie, to California. They eventually moved their family to a ranch in New Mexico and the Colorado mountains before settling in North Texas.

Johnson retired from acting and became a real estate agent. In 2014, he established Johnson Land and Home, LLC, a family owned business with over 25 years of experience in investment, acquisition, marketing, and development of luxury and destination properties, as well as ranch, hunting, and recreational land.

Personal life 
Johnson was married to his wife Laurie, a former model, for 35 years. They had eight children : Shane, Bellamy, Rachel, Eliana, Eden, Rebekah, Annabeth and William. Johnson restored old Winchester Model 1886 rifles before turning to selling ranch real estate in North Texas.

Death
Johnson died on February 18, 2022, at age 62, of COVID-19 complications. His death was publicly announced four months later by his former agent Linda McAlister.

Partial filmography

 1986 Dallas as Unknown
 1989 Nam Angels as Calhoun
 1989 Always as Ted Baker
 1991 Flight of the Intruder as Lieutenant Jake "Cool Hand" Grafton
 1992 An American Story as Major George Meade
 1992 Sketch Artist as Peter
 1993 Philadelphia Experiment II as David Herdeg
 1994 The Birds II: Land's End as Ted Hocken
 1994 Cries Unheard: The Donna Yaklich Story as Dennis Yaklich
 1995 Dominion as Harris
 1997 Soldier of Fortune, Inc. as Major Matthew Quentin Shepherd
 1997 Rough Riders as Henry Nash
 1999 Silk Hope as Rubin
 2000 Across the Line as Sheriff Grant Johnson
 2000 Left Behind as Captain Rayford Steele
 2001 Crossfire Trail as Beau Dorn
 2001 CSI as Paul Newsome, District Engineer (3 episodes)
 2002 Left Behind II: Tribulation Force as Captain Rayford Steele
 2003 Riverworld as Jeff Hale
 2004 The Robinsons: Lost in Space as John Robinson (Unsold pilot)
 2005 Wild Things: Diamonds in the Rough as Jay Clifton
 2005 Alien Siege as Dr. Stephen Chase
 2005 Left Behind: World at War as Captain Rayford Steele
 2007 Safe Harbour as Matt Bowles
 2007 Supergator as Professor Scott Kinney
 2008 Copperhead as Bill "Wild Bill" Longley
 2008 Comanche Moon (2008, TV Mini-Series) as Colonel Tom Soult
 2015 Nail 32 as Old Jasper "Buck" Livingston

References

External links
 
 Johnson Land and Home LLC Official Website

1959 births
2022 deaths
American male film actors
Male models from Arizona
American male television actors
Male Western (genre) film actors
Male actors from Tucson, Arizona
20th-century American male actors
21st-century American male actors
Deaths from the COVID-19 pandemic in Texas